Oxonine is an unsaturated heterocycle of nine atoms, with an oxygen replacing a carbon at one position. Oxonine is a nonaromatic compound.

See also
 Azonine
 Furan
 Cyclononatetraene
 Oxepin
 (2Z,4Z,6Z,8Z)-Thionine

References

Oxygen heterocycles
Heterocyclic compounds with 1 ring
Fully conjugated nonaromatic rings
Nine-membered rings